The 1997 Winchester by-election was a by-election to the UK House of Commons in the constituency of Winchester, Hampshire. Winchester was initially declared to have been won by Mark Oaten (Liberal Democrat) with a majority of two votes at the general election on 1 May 1997, but following a legal challenge, a new election was allowed by the High Court. The by-election, held on 20 November, was won by Oaten with a majority of 21,556.

History
At the general election on 1 May 1997, Mark Oaten was originally declared the winner, with a majority of two votes over Conservative Gerry Malone, 20 hours after starting to count votes, with many recounts and haggling over spoilt ballots.

Oaten was unseated on an electoral petition on 6 October 1997. The High Court held that 54 votes declared void for want of the official mark would have changed the result if counted. The court could not be sure they were not the product of a mistake, therefore deemed that the result was uncertain. They allowed the petition and declared the election void. The writ for the new election was moved on 28 October 1997.

The by-election on 20 November resulted in a clear win by Oaten – his majority was 21,556 over second placed Malone. Campaigning had focused on Oaten's speaking record in the House of Commons after the general election, while the nature of the controversial 1 May election result was also an issue for some Liberal Democrat voters.

The Independent wrote, "Although careful not to articulate it themselves, their unofficial campaign slogan is: 'When the umpire gives you out, you should walk'", alluding to the unseated Malone. The Labour Party obtained their worst ever results in a parliamentary election at the time, in part because they hardly campaigned at all and instead focused their priorities on the by-election in Beckenham held on the same day, which they also failed to win. The Winchester by-election remained Labour's worst-ever result until 2021, when they polled 1.6 percent of the vote in the Chesham and Amersham by-election, again won by the Lib Dems.

Both the original and rerun election involved an incidence of a candidate using an attempted confusing description. Richard Huggett described himself in the general election as Liberal Democrat Top Choice For Parliament (leading to Oaten, the official Lib Dem candidate, to use the ballot paper description Liberal Democrat Leader Paddy Ashdown) and in the by election as Literal Democrat Mark Here to Win. The Registration of Political Parties Act 1998 put an end to this practice.

This was also the last election in which Screaming Lord Sutch, founder of the Official Monster Raving Loony Party, ran for a parliamentary seat. He died by suicide in June 1999.

Results

General election result

References

External links
 "Winchester set for bitter election re-run", The Independent, 7 Oct 1997
 "Major boosts Malone's circus act", The Independent, 19 Nov 1997
 "Tories in turmoil as 'No Home Malone' fails", The Independent, 22 Nov 1997

1997 in England
1997 elections in the United Kingdom
By-elections to the Parliament of the United Kingdom in Hampshire constituencies
By-election, 1997
1990s in Hampshire
May 1997 events in the United Kingdom
November 1997 events in the United Kingdom